K. Soundararajan, born in 1938, was an Indian politician and former Member of the Legislative Assembly of Tamil Nadu. He was elected to the Tamil Nadu legislative assembly from Tiruchirappalli - II constituency as an Anna Dravida Munnetra Kazhagam candidate in 1977 and 1980 elections.

References 

All India Anna Dravida Munnetra Kazhagam politicians
Living people
Year of birth missing (living people)